André Marques (b. Setúbal, 1984) is a Portuguese film director, screenwriter and a musician. He currently lives in Portugal, having previously lived and worked in London and Bucharest.

Early life
Marques was born in Setúbal in 1984. Marques is a graduate from Escola Superior de Teatro e Cinema, class of 2006, where he studied Screenwriting and Film Production.

Career
His first experimental short film Going Blind was selected for DVD-Project and has toured around the world in art galleries and festivals.

His first fiction film João e o Cão (John and the Dog) was made with a low budget and with the collaboration of a young crew, some still in University. It premiered at the Berlin International Film Festival in 2008, and subsequently won the "Cacho Pallero Award" and a "Special Mention" for Chandra Malatitch at the Huesca International Film Festival, in Spain, and "Best New Director Award" at the Entre Todos Human Rights Short Film Festival, in Brazil, among other awards.

In 2008, Marques finished two short films. His second experimental short film, Boris Ghost Dog, was originally shot in the summer of 2004 using a Hi8 camera and is a study of a summer day with his dog Boris.O Lago (The Lake) is Marques' second fiction short film. With a running time of just above 30 minutes, it is somewhat of a road movie about two teenager friends who are going from world music summer festival to a hidden lake in south Portugal. O Lago had its international premiere at CineFest - International Festival of Young Filmmakers, in October 2009 in Hungary, followed by several other festivals, including Fantasporto IFF.

Going Blind, João e o Cão and O Lago have their soundtrack composed by the Belgo-Peruvian experimental musician jozefaleksanderpedro.
Boris Ghost Dog has music from Magudesi and Rafael Toral.

Schogetten is the conclusion of the unplanned "Kids" trilogy, after João e o Cão (John and the Dog) and O Lago (The Lake). It premiered at Anonimul International Film Festival, in Romania, and it went to screen in several other festivals.

Luminita, his fourth short fiction film, premiered in Portuguese theaters on 31 July 2014, after winning the AUDIENCE AWARD at the 21st Curtas Vila do Conde Film Festival, the SPECIAL JURY PRIZE & BEST SCRIPT AWARD at the 52nd International Film Festival Cinema de Gijón, in Spain, and the GRAND PRIX at the 20th Drama International Short Film Festival, in Greece, among others. Luminita was also the recipient for the SOPHIA AWARD for the Best Portuguese Short Film given by the Portuguese Cinema Academy.

In 2014 he made a music video for Gareth Dickson (Cara, in competition at MUVI Lisbon), O Avô (Grandpa) a one-minute short film that won PEOPLE’S CHOICE AWARD & CINEUROPA FILMINUTE AUDIENCE AWARD & JURY COMMENDATION PRIZE at the biggest festival of its kind, Filminute, and wrote the film project The Drunk that selected for the Biennale College Cinema 2015 of the 72nd Venice International Film Festival.

Marques also works in advertising/promos and has done work for Nike, EMI, Burberry, Abbey Road Studios, Steidl Mack and Hit+Run, among others.

From 2015 to 2018, Marques has shot 3 more music videos (Lazy Faithful - Frosted Glass, Gareth Dickson - Snag with the Language, Vaiapraia e as Rainhas do Baile - Snifa Cola/Kate Winslet), two new short fictions (Yulya, Câmara Nova/New Camera) and one short experimental documentary (Brother).

In 2019, two new short films were premiered: Look No Further and A Friend, the first being a portuguese-french co-production between Primeira Idade and Offshore with support from ICA/CNC and Fundação GDA, and the latter a no-budget short film with non-actors. Marques also served as producer and writer for the shorts, plus composing the soundtrack for Look No Further.

“O Bêbado” (The Drunk), his first feature length film, is now in post-production and is to premiered in 2023.

Filmography
 2006 - Going Blind (short exp)
 2007 - João e o Cão (short fiction)
 2008 - O Lago (short fiction)
 2008 - Boris Ghost Dog (short exp)
 2010 - Schogetten (short fiction)
 2012 - You Suck Me Dry (short exp)
 2013 - Luminita (short fiction)
 2014 - O Avô (one minute short fiction)
 2014 - Gareth Dickson - Cara (music video)
 2015 - Yulya (short fiction)
 2015 - Lazy Faithful - Frosted Glass (music video)
 2016 - Brother (short exp/doc)
 2016 - Gareth Dickson - Snag with the Language (music video)
 2017 - Câmara Nova (short fiction)
 2017 - Vaiapraia e as Rainhas do Baile - Snifa Cola/Kate Winslet (music video)
 2019 - O Amigo (short fiction)
 2019 - Look No Further (short fiction)
 2023 -  O Bêbado (The Drunk)  (feature film)

Discography
 2009 - Songs for Tomorrow

External links
  André Marques' Vimeo page
  André Marques at the Internet Movie Database
  André Marques at Bandcamp

References

1984 births
Living people
People from Setúbal
Portuguese film directors
Portuguese screenwriters
Male screenwriters
Portuguese male writers
Portuguese musicians
Portuguese male musicians